The Ottauquechee River Bridge is a steel girder bridge carrying United States Route 5 across the Ottauquechee River in Hartland, Vermont.  The bridge replaced a c. 1930 Warren deck truss bridge, built in the wake of Vermont's devastating 1927 floods, and listed on the National Register of Historic Places in 1990.

Location
The bridge is located in a rural section of northern Hartland, spanning the Ottauquechee River a short way downstream from the North Hartland Dam.  United States Route 5 is a major roadway providing local access along the Connecticut River, and is roughly paralleled by Interstate 91 to the east.

Historic bridge
The 1930 bridge was a four-span structure, mounted on concrete piers and abutments. The piers had rusticated and rounded ends, and the northernmost pier had an arch set between the I-beam spans. The guard rail consisted of T-shaped stanchions joined by a decorative metal latticework. The bridge was one of 1,600 built by the state after the 1927 floods, and was one of just four Warren deck truss structures built at the time. When the bridge was listed on the National Register in 1990, a nearly identical bridge stood in Bethel, spanning a branch of the White River.

See also
National Register of Historic Places listings in Windsor County, Vermont
List of bridges on the National Register of Historic Places in Vermont

References

Road bridges on the National Register of Historic Places in Vermont
National Register of Historic Places in Windsor County, Vermont
Bridges completed in 1930
Bridges in Windsor County, Vermont
Buildings and structures in Hartland, Vermont
Steel bridges in the United States
Girder bridges in the United States
Warren truss bridges in the United States